Ken Legler (December 27, 1957 – June 1, 2012) was an American politician who served as a member of the Texas House of Representatives from 2009–2012. He died of an apparent heart attack in June, 2012. His wife, Barbara Legler, succeeded him and served the remainder of his term.

Personal life 
Ken Legler attended San Jacinto College. Legler was the President & Owner of House Wire Works. He was also a member of the Bush Strike Force Team, Chamber of Commerce Board, National Federation of Independent Business Board, and Texas Association of Business Board. He was a Christian and attended Zion Lutheran Church, in Pasanda, Texas. He and his wife Barbara had 3 kids, Joseph, Krystina, Kathryn.

References 

Republican Party members of the Texas House of Representatives
1957 births
2012 deaths
San Jacinto College alumni
American Lutherans
21st-century American politicians